Saurashtra cricket team is one of the three first-class cricket teams based in Gujarat (the others being Baroda and Gujarat) that compete in the first-class tournament Ranji Trophy and limited-overs Vijay Hazare Trophy and Syed Mushtaq Ali Trophy.

Competition history
Previous teams competing from Saurashtra were Nawanagar and Western India. Nawanagar won the Ranji Trophy in 1936–37 and were runners up in 1937–38. Western India won the Ranji Trophy in 1943–44.

Saurashtra began competing in the 1950-51 Ranji Trophy. They were runners-up in the Ranji Trophy to Mumbai in 2012–13 and 2015–16 and in 2018–19 against Vidarbha. They finally won the Ranji Trophy for the first time in 2019–20 when they beat Bengal on first-innings lead in the final at Rajkot.

Honours
 Ranji Trophy
 Winners (2):  2022-23, 2019–20
 Runners-up (3): 2012–13, 2015–16, 2018–19

Home ground
Saurashtra Cricket Association Stadium, Rajkot
Madhavrao Sindhia Cricket Ground, Rajkot

International players
International players from Saurashtra cricket team include:
Karsan Ghavri
Ravindra Jadeja
Cheteshwar Pujara
Jaydev Unadkat
Chetan Sakariya

Robin Uthappa played two seasons for Saurashtra.

Players

Current squad 
Players with international caps are listed.

Updated as on 17 January 2023

Coaching staff
 Director of Cricket : n/a
 Head coach:  Niraj Odedra
 Assistant coach: n/a
 Batting coach: None
 Bowling coach: n/a
 Spin Bowling Coach: n/a
 Fielding coach: n/a
 Manager: Arjunsinh Rana
 Mental conditioning coach: Vacant
 Fitness trainer: n/a
 Head Physiotherapist: Abhishek Thakar
 Masseur: n/a
 Performance analyst: n/a

References

Indian first-class cricket teams
Cricket in Gujarat
1950 establishments in Bombay State
Cricket clubs established in 1950